Ulrikke is a feminine given name found primarily in Denmark and Norway. It is a feminine form of the masculine name Ulrik. Notable people named Ulrikke include:

 Ulrikke Brandstorp (born 1995), Norwegian singer
 Ulrikke Hansen Døvigen (born 1971), Norwegian actress
 Ulrikke Eikeri (born 1992), Norwegian tennis player
 Ulrikke Greve (1868–1951), Norwegian textile artist in the early 20th-century
 Ulrikke Høyer, Danish fashion model

See also
 Ulrikke, a short story by Jorge Luis Borges
 Ulrike, people known by the given name
 Ulrica / Ulrika, people known by the given name

References

Danish feminine given names
Norwegian feminine given names